The 2011 FA Challenge Cup was the 44th edition of the FA Challenge Cup, Botswana's premier football knockout tournament. It was sponsored by Coca-Cola and was known as the Coca-Cola Cup for sponsorship reasons. It started with the qualification round on 5 February 2011 and concluded with the final on 30 April 2011. The winner qualified for the 2013 CAF Confederation Cup.

Township Rollers were the defending champions but were eliminated by Uniao Flamengo Santos on penalties in the semifinals. Extension Gunners went on to win the title for a third time, ending a 17-year trophy drought.

Qualification round

Extra preliminary round

Preliminary round

1 This was a replay. The tie had originally been contested on the 19th, with Black Peril winning 4–0, but the result was annulled.

Round of 32

2 The tie was awarded to TAFIC after the match was halted due to a pitch invasion with them leading 1–0.

Round of 16

Quarterfinals

Semifinals

Final

Top scorers

Awards

References

Football in Botswana